Vabala is a river of  Biržai district municipality, Panevėžys County, northern Lithuania. It is a right tributary of the Tatula.

References

Rivers of Lithuania
Biržai District Municipality